Garoafa is a commune located in Vrancea County, Romania. It is composed of eight villages: Bizighești, Ciușlea, Doaga, Făurei, Garoafa, Precistanu, Răchitosu and Străjescu.

References

Communes in Vrancea County
Localities in Western Moldavia